Sasanam is a 2006 Indian Tamil-language film directed by Mahendran. The film set in the Chettinadu backdrop features Arvind Swamy, Gautami and Ranjitha in leading roles, while Balabharathi composes the music and Nambiyathiri handles cinematography. The film began production in the mid-1990s but was only released in 2006 due to production trouble, with all three of the lead actors retired at the time of release.

Plot 
Muthiah (Arvind Swamy) and his wife Visalakshi (Gautami) are a loving couple, and they come across Saroji (Ranjitha) who with no one to go for, takes refuge in Muthiah's house. Muthiah and Saroji develop soft corner towards each other. The rest is what transpires between the trio, exploring the nuances of an extra-marital affair.

Cast 
Arvind Swamy as Muthiah (Ramanathan)
Gautami as Visalakshi
Ranjitha as Saroji
Thalaivasal Vijay
Sabitha Anand
Sujitha
Vellai Subbaiah

Production 
The film began production in the mid-1990s and Balabharathi composed the music while Lenin and Vijayan were signed on as editors. Former State Assembly Speaker and senior AIADMK leader K. Kalimuthu penned a song for the film which was sung by Chithra, Sriram and Sathyanarayana. By January 1999, the film was described to be ready for release and Mahendran moved on to work on other projects.

By 2000, the film was referred to as "delayed, believed dead" by the media, with reporters suggesting that Gouthami's change since signing the film would hinder any chances of release. During production, the film's budget became overrun so Mahendran approached the National Film Development Corporation (NFDC) to take over the financing of the film in 2000. To avoid the film being delayed further due to financial problems, the lead actor Arvind Swamy opted against receiving any salary for the film.

The film later finally geared up for release in mid-2006 and during the time of release, Arvind Swamy and Gautami had already quit the Tamil film industry, while Ranjitha was semi-retired.

Soundtrack 
Soundtrack was composed by Balabharathi.
Pudhiya Kalai – Sriram, K. S. Chithra
Aasaigalai Nenjukulle – Malaysia Vasudevan
Poove Nee – KS Chithra
Vaazhkayin Vaasal – KS Chithra

Release 
Sasanam opened to average reviews with a reviewer citing that the film "tugs your heart strings, striking the right chord though a bit slow and old fashioned in shot compositions and presentation". In regard to performances, the critics adds that "Gouthami returns after a break and she is excellent as Visalakshi. Ranjita is the only drawback and she is not convincing as a dancer and is not able to  get her expressions correctly" and that Arvind Swamy is "first rate opting for a restrained mode in which he is able to bring out the pathos and hidden feeling of the character very well."

The film was later shown during the 7th annual film festival of India at Atlanta from 21 August 2009.

References

External links 
 

2006 films
Films directed by Mahendran (filmmaker)
2000s Tamil-language films
Films with screenplays by Mahendran (filmmaker)